Li Zhuo (born December 4, 1981 in Tieling, Liaoning) is a Chinese weightlifter. She competed in the 2004 Summer Olympics, winning the silver medal in the 48 kg class.

References
 profile

1981 births
Living people
Olympic silver medalists for China
Olympic weightlifters of China
People from Tieling
Weightlifters at the 2004 Summer Olympics
Olympic medalists in weightlifting
Asian Games medalists in weightlifting
Weightlifters from Liaoning
Weightlifters at the 2002 Asian Games
Chinese female weightlifters

Medalists at the 2004 Summer Olympics
Asian Games gold medalists for China
Medalists at the 2002 Asian Games
20th-century Chinese women
21st-century Chinese women